Legion is a 2010 American action horror film directed by Scott Stewart and co-written by Stewart and Peter Schink. The film stars Paul Bettany, Lucas Black, Tyrese Gibson, Adrianne Palicki, Kate Walsh, and Dennis Quaid. Sony Pictures Worldwide Acquisitions Group acquired most of the film's worldwide distribution rights, and the group opened the film in North America theatrically on January 22, 2010, through Screen Gems.

A television series titled Dominion, set 25 years after the film, premiered on the American cable television network Syfy on June 19, 2014.

Plot

The Archangel Michael falls to Earth in Los Angeles and cuts off his wings. After looting a weapons warehouse and stealing a police car, he travels towards the Paradise Falls Diner, near the edge of the Mojave Desert. Meanwhile, Kyle, a single father driving to Los Angeles, stops at the diner. He meets the owner, Bob Hanson; Jeep, Bob's son; Percy, the short-order cook; Charlie, a pregnant waitress; Howard and Sandra Anderson, a married couple; and Audrey, their rebellious teenaged daughter. As the diner's television, radio, and telephone fail, elderly Gladys enters the diner and becomes abnormally hostile, before biting a piece out of Howard's neck, whereupon Kyle shoots her. A gigantic swarm of flies surrounds the diner and isolates its patrons from the outside world, thwarting their attempt to transport Howard to the hospital.

Michael arrives and arms the patrons as the entire sky turns black. Hundreds of cars approach, filled with possessed people who begin to attack the diner. Michael leads the patrons in the fight, but Howard is dragged away. Later, Michael explains that God has lost faith in mankind and has sent his angels to destroy the human race. He also reveals that Charlie's baby must stay alive, as it is destined to be the savior of mankind; Michael disobeyed God's order to kill Charlie's baby, as he still has faith in humanity (at another time he tells Jeep that Jeep's decency is one of the reasons why he (Michael) still has this faith). Charlie will eventually come to love her baby, but initially (and quite unlike the Virgin Mary's acceptance of the unborn saviour in her womb in the Gospels) she says that she "hates the thing growing inside" her.

The next morning, Sandra discovers Howard crucified on an upside-down cross behind the restaurant and covered with huge boils. She tries to rescue him, but he explodes into acid. Percy dies shielding Sandra from the blast. Sandra goes insane and must be restrained. Meanwhile, the remaining survivors hear a radio transmission that reveals other pockets of resistance. One such refuge is nearby, but Michael advises them not to go, since they would be too vulnerable on the move. That night, a second wave of possessed people attacks. Kyle is lured into a trap and killed, while Charlie goes into labor. Audrey and Michael help to deliver the baby as trumpets sound, signaling the approach of the Archangel Gabriel. In a panic, Sandra breaks her restraints and tries to give the baby to the possessed, but Michael executes her. Moments later, Gabriel enters the diner and fatally wounds Bob. Michael urges the group to escape and tells Jeep to "find the prophets, learn to read the instructions".

The hordes of possessed humans cannot approach Charlie's baby; Jeep, Audrey, Charlie, and the baby go to Michael's stolen cruiser. Gabriel and Michael fight to a standstill before Gabriel stabs Michael through the chest with his morning star. Michael dies, and his body disappears. Dying, Bob uses his lighter to ignite the diner's gas main and blow up the diner, incinerating himself and the remaining possessed.

Jeep, his body covered in the same mysterious drawings seen on Michael's body, concludes that the tattoos are his instructions. Gabriel appears and a scuffle ensues in which Audrey is killed. Gabriel corners them in the nearby mountains and is about to kill them when Michael descends from Heaven, healed and restored to the rank of Archangel. Michael tells Gabriel that Gabriel gave God what He asked for, but Michael gave Him what He needed, giving humanity another chance; Michael says that this was God's plan to test his angels, believing they had become blind in their loyalty, and that as Gabriel continues to blindly obey God, Gabriel has failed Him. Ashamed, Gabriel leaves. Michael explains to Jeep that he is the child's true protector. Jeep asks Michael whether they will ever see him again, and Michael replies "Have faith", and then flies away. Charlie and Jeep reach the top of the mountain and see a small town in the valley below.

Later, Charlie, Jeep, and the baby drive away – the shot widens to show that the back of their vehicle is full of weapons.

Cast
 Paul Bettany as Michael, a fallen archangel, leader of the human survivors, and Gabriel's brother.
 Lucas Black as "Jeep" Hanson, Bob's son, who works as a mechanic. He's in love with Charlie, but is not the father of her child, and has never slept with her.
 Tyrese Gibson as Kyle Williams, a divorced man heading to L.A. to battle over custody of his son.
 Adrianne Palicki as Charlie, a downtrodden, pregnant waitress whose baby is humanity's savior.
 Charles S. Dutton as Percy Walker, the diner's religious short order cook. He lost a hand serving as a soldier.
 Jon Tenney as Howard Anderson, Sandra's husband and Audrey's father.
 Kevin Durand as Gabriel, leader of the angel army sent to destroy humanity, and Michael's brother.
 Willa Holland as Audrey Anderson, Howard and Sandra's daughter.
 Kate Walsh as Sandra Anderson, Howard's wife and Audrey's mother.
 Dennis Quaid as Bob Hanson, the diner's atheist owner.
 Jeanette Miller as Gladys Foster, the possessed old woman who's the first to attack the diner.
 Cameron Harlow as Minivan Boy, the possessed child who tries to stab Charlie in the stomach.
 Doug Jones as Ice Cream Man, the possessed man who worked at the ice cream truck.
 Luke Stinehart as the baby.

Production
Principal photography took place in New Mexico in the spring of 2008.

The Director of Photography was John Lindley.

Reception

Box office
Legion was released on January 22, 2010, in 2,476 theaters and took in $6,686,233—$2,700 per theater its opening day.  On its opening weekend, it grossed $17,501,625—$7,069 per theater and placed second behind Avatar. It placed No. 6 on its second weekend, and grossed an estimated $6,800,000—$2,746 per theater, a 61.1% drop from the previous weekend. The film has come to gross $67,918,658 worldwide.

Critical response
Review aggregator Rotten Tomatoes gives the film a score of 20% based on reviews from 104 critics, with an average rating of 3.78 out of 10. The site's consensus is: "Despite a solid cast and intermittent thrills, Legion suffers from a curiously languid pace, confused plot, and an excess of dialogue." Metacritic, which assigns a weighted average score out of 0–100 reviews from film critics, has a rating score of 32% based on 14 reviews. Audiences polled by CinemaScore gave the film an average grade of "C-" on an A+ to F scale.

Paul Nicholasi of Dread Central gave the film a one and a half out of five stars, saying, "The finished product is shockingly bad. If countless angles of people firing guns with spent shells clinking to the ground is all your heart yearns for, then Legion may be your ideal Saturday night. Hoping for anything more is an exercise in futility. Spare yourself the agony." Brad Miska of Bloody Disgusting gave it 1 out of 5 stars, calling it "a prude film with some potential. It's boring, slow paced and it takes itself way too seriously." Variety film critic Joe Leydon gave the film a mixed analysis. Leydon claimed "Even when the blood-and-thunder hokiness of the over-the-top plot tilts perilously close to absurdity, the admirably straight-faced performances by well-cast lead players provide just enough counterbalance to sustain curiosity and sympathy." Frank Scheck of The Hollywood Reporter also gave the film a mixed review stating, "the goings-on in Legion are seriously silly (not to mention more than a little derivative of endless movies, especially the Terminator series), but director Scott Stewart has provided enough stylish finesse to make the proceedings a real hoot."

Kim Newman compares the film to Tales from the Crypt: Demon Knight, The Terminator, and The Prophecy, stating, "In most religious-themed-end-of-the-world films - and there are more than you'd think - its the righteous who stand against the dark. Here, it's gun-owners, which suggests how thoroughly screwed-up Legion's values are."

Collis Clark of Entertainment Weekly refers to this movie as dull: "The problem lies not with the cast, and Kate Walsh in particular deserves some sort of medal for the scene in which she narrowly escapes being dissolved by pus. Alas, the script is a rough beast that slouches toward utter ludicrousness. 'The future has been unwritten!' intones Paul Bettany's Michael at one point. But Legion barely seems to have been written at all."

Mike Hale of The New York Times says, "Unfortunately, the script by Scott Stewart, who directed, and Peter Schink emphasizes stagebound melodramatics and banal television-style catharsis over action and humor... Amid a bull market for end-of-days tales, 'Legion' stands out for its explicitly biblical underpinnings and its claustrophobia."

Peter Bradshaw in The Guardian says, "Not many horror movies have the decency to let elderly performers steal the show. But Jeanette Miller absolutely walks off with this one, in the robustly written role of a potty-mouthed satanic old lady who takes a fatal bite out of someone's neck. Paul Bettany plays the particularly badass angel who comes to earth in an attempt to stop God and his heavenly armies wiping out humanity."

Home media
Legion was released on DVD and Blu-ray on May 11, 2010.

In other media

Television

In 2014, Syfy began airing the television series Dominion, a sequel set 25 years after the end of the film. Scott Stewart, the writer/director of Legion, served as executive producer. Stewart also directed Dominions pilot episode, which was written by Vaun Wilmott and aired on June 19, 2014.

See also
 List of films about angels

References

External links
 
 
  
 
 
 
 

2010 films
2010 horror films
2010s action horror films
2010s fantasy adventure films
2010s supernatural horror films
American fantasy action films
American fantasy adventure films
American supernatural horror films
American action horror films
Adventure horror films
Supernatural action films
Apocalyptic films
Films about angels
Films adapted into television shows
Films directed by Scott Stewart (director)
Films set in Los Angeles
Films set in restaurants
Films shot in New Mexico
Films scored by John Frizzell (composer)
American pregnancy films
Bold Films films
Screen Gems films
2010 directorial debut films
2010s English-language films
2010s American films